In functional analysis, it is often convenient to define a linear transformation on a complete, normed vector space  by first defining a linear transformation  on a dense subset of  and then continuously extending  to the whole space via the theorem below. The resulting extension remains linear and bounded, and is thus continuous, which makes it a continuous linear extension. 

This procedure is known as continuous linear extension.

Theorem

This theorem is sometimes called the BLT theorem.

Application

Consider, for instance, the definition of the Riemann integral. A step function on a closed interval   is a function of the form: 
where  are real numbers,  and  denotes the indicator function of the set  The space of all step functions on  normed by the  norm (see Lp space), is a normed vector space which we denote by  Define the integral of a step function by:  
 as a function is a bounded linear transformation from  into 

Let  denote the space of bounded, piecewise continuous functions on  that are continuous from the right, along with the  norm.

The Hahn–Banach theorem

However, the extension may not be unique.

See also

References

 

Functional analysis
Linear operators